The Zhunggar is a large coal field located in the north of China in Xinjiang. Zhunggar represents one of the largest coal reserve in China having estimated reserves of 10 billion tonnes of coal.

See also 

Coal in China
List of coalfields

References 

Coal in China
Geology of Xinjiang
Mining companies based in Xinjiang